Stidham is a town in McIntosh County, Oklahoma, United States. The population was 16 at the 2010 census, a decline of 21.7 percent from 23 in 2000.

Geography
Stidham is located at  (35.368905, -95.700720).

Demographics

As of the census of 2000, there were 23 people, 10 households, and 5 families residing in the town. There were 14 housing units at an average density of 418.9 per square mile (180.2/km2). The racial makeup of the town was 52.17% White, and 47.83% Native American.

There were 10 households, out of which 30.0% had children under the age of 18 living with them, 40.0% were married couples living together, 10.0% had a female householder with no husband present, and 50.0% were non-families. 40.0% of all households were made up of individuals, and 20.0% had someone living alone who was 65 years of age or older. The average household size was 2.30 and the average family size was 3.40.

In the town, the population was spread out, with 26.1% under the age of 18, 13.0% from 18 to 24, 26.1% from 25 to 44, 26.1% from 45 to 64, and 8.7% who were 65 years of age or older. The median age was 42 years. For every 100 females, there were 64.3 males. For every 100 females age 18 and over, there were 70.0 males.

The median income for a household in the town was $22,708, and the median income for a family was $23,333. Males had a median income of $23,750 versus $13,750 for females. The per capita income for the town was $3,764. There are 25.0% of families living below the poverty line and 10.7% of the population, including none under 18 and 100.0% of those over 64.

History

Jackey "Pete" Lyle Bedford, local farmer, was born on April 20, 1944, in Eufaula, Oklahoma. While attending Connors College, he played baseball in Muskogee with the American Legion. He also played baseball in the San Francisco Giants' training camp for two summers while in college. He died November 12, 2011.

References

Towns in McIntosh County, Oklahoma
Towns in Oklahoma